Daltonganj   is an assembly constituency in  the Indian state of Jharkhand.

Members of Assembly 
1977: Puran Chand, Janata Party
1980: Inder Singh Namdhari, Bharatiya Janata Party
1985: Ishwar Chandra Pandey, Indian National Congress
1990: Inder Singh Namdhari, Bharatiya Janata Party
1995: Inder Singh Namdhari, Janata Dal
2000: Inder Singh Namdhari, Janata Dal (United)
2000: Inder Singh Namdhari, Janata Dal (United)
2007: Inder Singh Namdhari, Independent
2009: Krishna Nand Tripathi, Indian National Congress
2014: Alok Kumar Chaurasiya, Jharkhand Vikas Morcha
2015: Alok Kumar Chaurasiya, Bharatiya Janata Party (Six Jharkhand Vikas Morcha MLAs joined BJP) 
2019: Alok Kumar Chaurasiya, Bharatiya Janata Party

See also
Vidhan Sabha
List of states of India by type of legislature

References
http://www.thehindu.com/news/national/other-states/six-jvmp-mlas-join-bjp/article6882145.ece

Assembly constituencies of Jharkhand
Medininagar